Toragrella is a genus of harvestmen in the family Sclerosomatidae.

Species
 Toragrella longipes Roewer, 1955
 Toragrella normalis

References

Harvestmen
Harvestman genera